The Myrrhinidae are a taxonomic family of colourful sea slugs. These are specifically aeolid nudibranchs. They are marine gastropod molluscs.

Taxonomy 
DNA studies found the Facelinidae to be polyphyletic and this family was brought back into use to partially resolve that situation.

Genera 
Genera within the family Myrrhinidae include:
 Dondice Er. Marcus, 1958 
 Godiva Macnae, 1954
 Hermissenda Bergh, 1879
 Nanuca Er. Marcus, 1957
 Nemesignis Furfaro & Mariottini, 2021
 Phyllodesmium Ehrenberg, 1831 (1828)
Synonyms
 Nemesis Furfaro & Mariottini, 2021: synonym of Nemesignis Furfaro & Mariottini, 2021 (invalid: junior homonym of Nemesis Risso, 1826 [Crustacea]; Nemesignis is a replacement name)

References

External links
 Bergh, L.S.R., 1905. [https://www.biodiversitylibrary.org/page/11650714 Die Opisthobranchiata der Siboga-expedition. Siboga-Expeditie. 50: 1-248, pls 1-20, page(s): 226</ref>]
 Bouchet, P. & Rocroi, J.-P. (2005). Classification and nomenclator of gastropod families. Malacologia. 47 (1-2): 1-397.

 
Gastropod families